Łukasz Kosakiewicz (born 19 September 1990) is a Polish professional footballer who plays as a right-back for Polish club Kotwica Kołobrzeg.

References

1990 births
Sportspeople from Szczecin
Living people
Polish footballers
Association football defenders
Czarni Żagań players
Błękitni Stargard players
Chojniczanka Chojnice players
Korona Kielce players
Widzew Łódź players
Znicz Pruszków players
Sandecja Nowy Sącz players
Kotwica Kołobrzeg footballers
Ekstraklasa players
I liga players
II liga players
III liga players